Texas Trouble Shooters is a 1942 American Western film directed by S. Roy Luby and written by Arthur Hoerl. The film is the fifteenth in Monogram Pictures' "Range Busters" series, and it stars Ray "Crash" Corrigan as Crash, John "Dusty" King as Dusty and Max "Alibi" Terhune as Alibi, with Julie Duncan, Glenn Strange and Riley Hill. The film was released on June 12, 1942.

Plot

Cast
Ray "Crash" Corrigan as 'Crash' Corrigan 
John 'Dusty' King as 'Dusty' King
Max Terhune as 'Alibi' Terhune
Julie Duncan as Judy Wilson
Glenn Strange as Roger Denby 
Riley Hill as Bret Travis
Kermit Maynard as Pete
Eddie Phillips as Wade Evans
Frank Ellis as Duke
Ted Mapes as Slim
Gertrude Hoffmann as Granny Wilson
Steve Clark as Bill Ames
Jack Holmes as Perry

See also
The Range Busters series:
 The Range Busters (1940)
 Trailing Double Trouble (1940)
 West of Pinto Basin (1940)
 Trail of the Silver Spurs (1941)
 The Kid's Last Ride (1941)
 Tumbledown Ranch in Arizona (1941)
 Wrangler's Roost (1941)
 Fugitive Valley (1941)
 Saddle Mountain Roundup (1941)
 Tonto Basin Outlaws (1941)
 Underground Rustlers (1941)
 Thunder River Feud (1942)
 Rock River Renegades (1942)
 Boot Hill Bandits (1942)
 Texas Trouble Shooters (1942)
 Arizona Stage Coach (1942)
 Texas to Bataan (1942)
 Trail Riders (1942)
 Two Fisted Justice (1943)
 Haunted Ranch (1943)
 Land of Hunted Men (1943)
 Cowboy Commandos (1943)
 Black Market Rustlers (1943)
 Bullets and Saddles (1943)

References

External links
 

1942 films
1940s English-language films
American Western (genre) films
1942 Western (genre) films
Monogram Pictures films
Films directed by S. Roy Luby
American black-and-white films
Range Busters
1940s American films